Alexandre Léon Étard was a French chemist. He was born on 5 January 1852 in Alençon, and died on 1 May 1910 in Paris.

Étard was a preparer at the Wurtz Laboratory at École Pratique des Hautes Études, and became a member of the Société de Chimie Industrielle in 1875. He studied at the Sorbonne, and earned a Doctorate in Physical Sciences in 1880.

Étard discovered the oxidation reaction of methyl groups linked to aromatic rings or to heterocycles using chromyl chloride, known as the Étard reaction. Chromyl chloride is sometimes also called "Étard reagent".

Publications 
 Les Nouvelles Théories chimiques, Paris, G. Masson, 1895 .
 La biochimie et les chlorophylles, Masson et Cie (Paris), 1906. Online text available on IRIS

References

19th-century French chemists
1852 births
1910 deaths
20th-century French chemists
People from Alençon